The CZW Hall of Fame is an American professional wrestling hall of fame maintained by the Philadelphia-based hardcore-oriented promotion Combat Zone Wrestling. It was established in 2004 to honor wrestlers who have wrestled for the promotion.

Inductees

See also
List of professional wrestling halls of fame

References

Sources
Inductees – Ring name / CZW debut / Year : CZW Hall of Fame

External links
CZW Hall of Fame website

2004 establishments in the United States
Awards established in 2004
Hall of Fame
Professional wrestling halls of fame
Halls of fame in Delaware